Obosi is a city in Anambra State, southeastern Nigeria. It is a city hosting one of the most famous market in Nigeria, Mgbuka Obosi, among others. it also hosts the metropolitan areas of Enekwasumpu, Ozalla, Army Barracks, Umuota and Awada which is arguably the most populated urban settlement after Lagos, Nigeria.

History

Obosi and her related towns
Presently Obosi Ukwala is situated in a hilly area, bordered by Onitsha to the North-west, Nkpor to the North-east and Oba to the south-east, all part of the old Idemili local government area, with the exception of Onitsha. Obosi lands includes John Otu Obosi (now fegge), Nkpor, Woliwo, Enekwasumpu layout and all parts of Awada. Many lands of Obosi lands are disputed and renamed but the Obosi is still the original owner of these lands.

Population growth and development 
Since the war, Obosi has had major immigration from elsewhere in Nigeria, such that only one in fifteen residents are considered indigenous to Obosi. Including the extensive housing districts in Obosi Kingdom like Maryland, (Presently Fegge), Ata Mpama (Presently in Ogbaru LGA, as ceded in 1983 by Capt. Akunobi, the then military Administrator), Ugwuagba, Okpoko, Enekwasumpu, Omaba I, Omaba II, Achaputa, Nkpikpa, Ozala and Little Wood. The school of health technology, Electrical Material Dealers Market, Anambra Broadcasting Service Awada Obosi and Minaj Broadcast International have been important in the development of the Kingdom. As of 2020 it has an estimated population of over 1.5 million in the densely populated city.

Notable people
 Chief Emeka Anyaoku, a former Commonwealth Secretary General.
 Chief Chimezie Ikeazor, Senior Advocate of Nigeria 
 Justice Kenneth Keazor
 Late Chief Dr G C Mbanugo CFR (Ogene of Obosi) Chairman NCNC Eastern Working Committee. Eastern Finance Corporation. Eastern Nigeria Development Corporation (ENDC)

References 

Populated places in Anambra State